Milan Matula (born 22 April 1984 in Trutnov) is a Czech football defender currently playing for FC Oberlausitz Neugersdorf in Germany.

References
 
 
 Guardian Football

1984 births
Living people
Czech footballers
Czech Republic youth international footballers
Czech Republic under-21 international footballers
Czech First League players
FK Teplice players
FC Slovan Liberec players
SFC Opava players
Association football defenders
FC Oberlausitz Neugersdorf players
People from Trutnov
Sportspeople from the Hradec Králové Region